Klévisson Viana (Quixeramobim, November 3, 1972) is a Brazilian cordel literature poet, comics artist and editor. In 1995 he founded the Tupynanquim publishing house, specialized in comics and cordel. He is also a member of the Brazilian Cordel Literature Academy. He started working as illustrator in 1988, at the age of 15, in the newspaper A Voz do Povo, in Canindé. He won the Troféu HQ Mix three times: best national graphic novel in 1999 (for Lampião: era o cavalo do tempo atrás da besta da vida), best adventure and fiction magazine in 2001 (for Mirabilia) and best national special edition in 2004 (for A Moça que Namorou o Bode). Viana also won the third place in Prêmio Jabuti in 2014 with the adaptation of The Guarani in cordel.

References 

Comic book publishers (people)
Comic book editors
Brazilian poets
1972 births
Living people